Hyponerita is a genus of moths in the family Erebidae erected by George Hampson in 1901.

Species
Hyponerita amelia Schaus, 1911
Hyponerita brueckneri Gaede, 1928
Hyponerita hamoia Joicey & Talbot, 1916
Hyponerita incerta Schaus, 1905
Hyponerita ishima Schaus, 1933
Hyponerita lavinia (Druce, 1890)
Hyponerita parallela Gaede, 1928
Hyponerita pinon (Druce, 1911)
Hyponerita rhodocraspis Hampson, 1909
Hyponerita rosaceata Watson & Goodger, 1986
Hyponerita similis Rothschild, 1909
Hyponerita tipolis (Druce, 1896)

References

Phaegopterina
Moth genera